Rastorguyev or Rastorguev may refer to
Rastorguyev (surname)
Rastorguev Glacier in Antarctica 
Rastorguyev Island in the Kara Sea in Russia
Rastorguyev-Kharitonov Palace in Yekaterinburg, Russia